Erik Schønfeldt  (born 19 November 1942) is a Norwegian handball player and footballer.

He made his debut on the Norwegian national handball team in 1960, 
and played 45 matches for the national team between 1960 and 1968. He participated at the 1964 and 1967 World Men's Handball Championship.

He is the father of Norway international handballer Morten Schønfeldt.

Schønfeldt was also an active football player. Playing for the club Frigg, he participated in the final of the 1965 Norwegian Football Cup.

References

1942 births
Living people
Norwegian male handball players
Norwegian footballers
Frigg Oslo FK players
Association footballers not categorized by position